Geronimo Goeloe (born 18 November 1981) is a sprinter,  specializing in the 100 and 200 metres. He competed for the Netherlands Antilles until the dissolution of that country and now represents Aruba. He also holds the current national record, with a time of 10.42 seconds.

Biography
Goeloe finished sixth in 4×100 metres relay at the 2005 World Championships, together with teammates Charlton Rafaela, Jairo Duzant and Churandy Martina.

On the individual level he won a bronze medal at the 2005 South American Championships. Participating in 200 m at the 2004 Summer Olympics, he was knocked out in the heats.

Goeloe is also a three times MVP of the LAI 2004-2005-2006 (Liga Inter Universitaria held in Puerto Rico). He won the 100 m and the 400 m for three consecutive years, the 200 m for two years in a row and finished third in the 200 m in his third year.

He has a bachelor's degree in physical education learning and teaching, at this point conducting a master's degree course in English as a second language.

Achievements

References

External links

1981 births
Living people
Dutch Antillean male sprinters
Athletes (track and field) at the 2003 Pan American Games
People from Willemstad
Athletes (track and field) at the 2004 Summer Olympics
Olympic athletes of the Netherlands Antilles
World Athletics Championships athletes for Aruba
Pan American Games competitors for the Netherlands Antilles
Aruban male sprinters